The coat of arms of the Bahamas contains a shield with the national symbols as its focal point.

Official description
The blazon of the coat of arms is described in Bahamas law:

Arms: Upon a representation of the Santa Maria on a base barry wavy of four Azure and Argent on a Chief Azure demisun Or.

Crest: Upon a representation of Our Royal Helmet mantled Azure doubled Argent on a Wreath Or and Azure. A Conch Shell proper in front of a Panache of Palm Fronds proper.

Supporters: On the dexter side a Marlin proper and on the sinister side a Flamingo proper; and upon a Compartment per pale Waves of the Sea and Swampland proper.

Motto: “Forward, Upward, Onward Together”.

Explanation
The escutcheon (shield) is supported by a marlin and flamingo. The crest on top of the helm (helmet) is a conch shell, which represents the varied marine life of the island chain.  Below the helm is the escutcheon itself, whose main charge is a ship, reputed to represent the Santa María of Christopher Columbus.  It is sailing beneath a sun in the chief.  The animals supporting the shield are the national animals, and the national motto is found at the bottom.  The flamingo is located upon land, and the marlin upon sea, indicating the geography of the islands.  

The vibrant tinctures of the coat of arms are also intended to point to a bright future for the islands.  They are also reputed to have been maintained for their attractiveness to tourists.

The coat of arms was approved by Queen Elizabeth II on 7 December 1971. It was designed by Bahamian artist and clergyman, Dr. Hervis L. Bain, Jr., who is also a member of the Order of the British Empire.

History

Island arms
In addition to the National Coat of Arms, there are a total of eighteen regional island shields (including two unofficial devices). These were granted upon Independence in 1973, to be displayed at the Independence day celebration to reflect each island's individual cultural heritage.

References

External links
  Coat of arms of Bahamas In The World All Countries Coat of arms

Bahamas
National symbols of the Bahamas
Bahamas
Bahamas
Bahamas
Bahamas
Bahamas
Bahamas
Bahamas
Society of the Bahamas
Bahamas